Kansas's 28th Senate district is one of 40 districts in the Kansas Senate. It has been represented by Republican Mike Petersen since 2005.

Geography
District 28 covers southern Wichita and its immediate suburbs in Sedgwick County, including Oaklawn-Sunview and parts of Derby.

The district is located entirely within Kansas's 4th congressional district, and overlaps with the 81st, 82nd, 83rd, 86th, 88th, 96th, 97th, and 98th districts of the Kansas House of Representatives.

Recent election results

2020

2016

2012

Federal and statewide results in District 28

References

28
Sedgwick County, Kansas